Bruno José Pavan Lamas is a Brazilian professional footballer who plays for Busan IPark FC.

Club career
He made his professional debut in the Segunda Liga for Leixões on 22 February 2015 against Desportivo das Aves.

In 2021 he transferred to South Korean side Daegu FC in the K-League.

After his debut season in South Korea, Bruno transferred to Busan IPark, another South Korean club.

References

External links

1994 births
People from São José do Rio Preto
Brazilian people of Italian descent
Living people
Brazilian footballers
Associação Desportiva São Caetano players
Leixões S.C. players
C.D. Santa Clara players
Khor Fakkan Sports Club players
Primeira Liga players
Liga Portugal 2 players
UAE Pro League players
Brazilian expatriate footballers
Expatriate footballers in Portugal
Expatriate footballers in the United Arab Emirates
Brazilian expatriate sportspeople in Portugal
Brazilian expatriate sportspeople in the United Arab Emirates
Association football midfielders
Footballers from São Paulo (state)